The 2023 Canberra Raiders Cup will be the 25th season of the cup, the top division Rugby League club competition in Canberra. The 2023 Canberra Raiders Cup will consist of 18 regular season rounds that will begin on 15 April and end on 26 August. There will be 3 playoff rounds, beginning on 2 September with the first semi-final, and ending on 17 September with the Grand Final.

Canberra Raiders Cup (First Grade)

Teams 
There will be 9 teams playing in 2023. 5 teams from Canberra, 2 from Queanbeyan, 1 from Yass, and 1 from Goulburn.

Ladder

Ladder progression 

 Numbers highlighted in green indicate that the team finished the round inside the top 4.
 Numbers highlighted in blue indicates the team finished first on the ladder in that round.
 Numbers highlighted in red indicates the team finished last place on the ladder in that round.
 Underlined numbers indicate that the team had a bye during that round.

Season results

Round 1

Round 2

Round 3

Round 4

Round 5

Round 6

Round 7

Round 8

Round 9

Round 10

Round 11

Round 12

Round 13

Round 14

Round 15

Round 16

Round 17

Round 18

Finals Series

Reserve Grade

Teams

Ladder

Ladder progression 

 Numbers highlighted in green indicate that the team finished the round inside the top 4.
 Numbers highlighted in blue indicates the team finished first on the ladder in that round.
 Numbers highlighted in red indicates the team finished last place on the ladder in that round.
 Underlined numbers indicate that the team had a bye during that round.

Season results

Round 1

Round 2

Round 3

Round 4

Round 5

Round 6

Round 7

Round 8

Round 9

Round 10

Round 11

Round 12

Round 13

Round 14

Round 15

Round 16

Round 17

Round 18

Finals Series

George Tooke Shield (Second Division) 
There will be 9 teams playing in 2022. 3 teams from Canberra. 6 teams from New South Wales towns surrounding Canberra.

Ladder

Ladder Progression 

 Numbers highlighted in green indicate that the team finished the round inside the top 5.
 Numbers highlighted in blue indicates the team finished first on the ladder in that round.
 Numbers highlighted in red indicates the team finished last place on the ladder in that round.
 Underlined numbers indicate that the team had a bye during that round.

Season Results

Round 1

Round 2

Round 3

Round 4

Round 5

Round 6

Round 7

Round 8

Round 9

Round 10

Round 11

Round 12

Round 13

Round 14

Round 15

Round 16

Finals Series

Katrina Fanning Shield (Open Women's Tackle) 

2023 Katrina Fanning Shield Draw TBA

Under 19s 

2023 Under 19s Draw TBA

Canberra Raiders Cup Ladies League Tag 

2023 Canberra Raiders Cup Ladies League Tag Draw TBA

Second Division Ladies League Tag 

2023 Second Division Ladies League Tag Draw TBA

Monaro Knockout 
The Monaro Knockout will be a knockout pre season competition held in Batemans Bay. It will feature teams from the George Tooke Shield, Group 16 Premiership and the Woodbridge Cup.

Teams

Men's

Ladies League Tag

Men's Draw

Ladies League Tag Draw

Categories 
:Category:Sport in Canberra

References 

Rugby league in Australia
Rugby league
Rugby league competitions
Rugby league competitions in Australia